IPMI may refer to:

 Information Processing in Medical Imaging, a medical imaging conference
 Intelligent Platform Management Interface, in computing
 Ivey Purchasing Managers Index, in economics